The Miss New Hampshire  is the scholarship program that selects the representative for the state of New Hampshire in the Miss America competition.

The Miss New Hampshire program was conducted by the Union Leader newspaper for more than 50 years. In the early years of Miss America, it was city newspapers that sponsored the young women to go to Atlantic City as the Miss America Organization originally allowed city titleholders to compete. The Union Leader conducted the pageant from 1947 until 2001. The newspaper held the pageant from at least 1985 to 2001 at the Manchester Central High School auditorium.

In 2000, a non-profit corporation formed and was granted the license by the Miss America Organization to conduct the state program from 2002 through today. Originally run by former Miss Greater Derry local chapter leaders, the Miss New Hampshire Scholarship Program, Inc. is now a 501(c)(4) civic organization while the Miss New Hampshire Scholarship Foundation, which grants the scholarships, is a 501(c)(3) public charity.  Brenda Keith of Derry served as Board President and Executive Director until she joined the Board of Direcotrs of the Miss America Organization in September 2018 for a two-year term.  William Haggerty served as president until her return on January 1, 2021.  Lynne Ulaky and Claudette Jolin serve as the Co-Executive Directors. The competition was moved to Derry in 2003 and is held annually at Pinkerton Academy's Stockbridge Theatre. 

The Miss New Hampshire scholarship program grants more scholarships than most other states in the Miss America Program. In 2021, the Miss New Hampshire Scholarship Foundation granted $100,000 in scholarships to the 26 contestants who competed after winning their local titles. Prior to the State competition, the NH local programs grant another $80,00-$85,000 a year at the local level. The local programs are all non-profit corporations with group 501(c)(3) tax exempt status.

Sarah White of Weirs Beach was crowned Miss New Hampshire on April 30, 2022, at the Stockbridge theater in Derry, New Hampshire. She competed for the title of Miss America 2023 at the Mohegan Sun in Uncasville, Connecticut in December 2023.

Gallery of past titleholders

Results summary
The following is a visual summary of the past results of Miss New Hampshire titleholders at the national Miss America pageants/competitions. The year in parentheses indicates the year of the national competition during which a placement and/or award was garnered, not the year attached to the contestant's state title.

Placements
4th runners-up: Nancy Anne Naylor (1967)
 Top 10: Candace Glickman (2004)
 Top 15: Edna Jones (1936), Coleen Gallant (1952)

Awards

Preliminary awards
 Preliminary Lifestyle and Fitness: Nancy Anne Naylor (1967), Candace Glickman (2004)
 Preliminary Talent: Tricia Ann-Regan McEachern (1994), Samantha Russo (2014)

Non-finalist awards
 Non-finalist Interview: Alyssa Spellman (2005)
 Non-finalist Talent: Mary Morin (1959), Michelle Cote (1974), Natalie Oliver (1982), Tricia Ann-Regan McEachern (1994), Samantha Russo (2014), Caroline Carter (2017)

Other awards
 Miss Congeniality: Margaret Wass (1963), Sheila Scott (1968) (tie)
 Bernie Wayne Scholarship: Tricia Ann-Regan McEachern (1994)
 Dr. David B. Allman Medical Scholarship: Cynthia Erb (1975)
 Dr. Marcia L. Leek Scholarship: Lauren Percy (2018)
 Neat as a Pin Award: Kristi Carlson (1972) (tie)
 Pyramid Scholarship for Public Relations & Marketing: Rachel Barker (2008)
 Quality of Life Award Winners: Brandee Helbick (2000)
 Quality of Life Award 1st runners-up: Lindsey Graham (2010), Regan Hartley (2012)
 STEM Scholarship Award Finalists: Marisa Moorhouse (2019)

Winners

Notes

References

External links
 Miss New Hampshire official website

New Hampshire
New Hampshire culture
Women in New Hampshire
Recurring events established in 1925
1925 establishments in New Hampshire
Annual events in New Hampshire